Anomalocardia is a genus of bivalves belonging to the family Veneridae.

The genus has almost cosmopolitan distribution.

Species:
Anomalocardia brasiliana 
Anomalocardia cuneimeris 
Anomalocardia flexuosa 
Anomalocardia hendriana 
Anomalocardia heothina 
Anomalocardia nesiotica 
Anomalocardia puella 
Anomolocardia producta

References

Veneridae
Bivalve genera